Lower Castle Zizers is a castle located in the municipality of Zizers in the Canton of Graubünden, Switzerland.  It is a Swiss heritage site of national significance.

See also
 List of castles in Switzerland

References

Cultural property of national significance in Graubünden
Castles in Graubünden